The 2015 Seguros Bolívar Open Cali was a professional tennis tournament played on clay courts. It was the eight edition of the tournament which was part of the 2015 ATP Challenger Tour. It took place in Cali, Colombia between 4 and 10 May 2015.

Singles main-draw entrants

Seeds

1 Rankings as of April 27, 2015.

Other entrants
The following players received wildcards into the singles main draw:
  José Carvajal
  Daniel Elahi Galán
  Felipe Mantilla
  David Souto

The following players used protected ranking to gain into the singles main draw:
  Carlos Salamanca

The following players received entry from the qualifying draw:
  Gonzalo Escobar
  Fernando Romboli
  Wilson Leite
  Nicolas Santos

Doubles main-draw entrants

Seeds

1 Rankings as of April 27, 2015.

Other entrants 
The following pairs received wildcards into the singles main draw:
 Juan Sebastián Gómez /  Nicolás Kicker
 José Daniel Bendeck /  Alejandro Gómez
 Carlos Salamanca /  David Souto

Champions

Singles

 Fernando Romboli def.  Giovanni Lapentti, 4–6, 6–3, 6–2

Doubles

  Marcelo Demoliner /  Miguel Ángel Reyes-Varela def.  Emilio Gómez /  Roberto Maytín, 6–1, 6–2

External links
Official Website

Seguros Bolivar Open Cali
Seguros Bolívar Open Cali
2015 in Colombian tennis